German submarine U-443 was a Type VIIC U-boat built for Nazi Germany's Kriegsmarine for service during World War II.

She was laid down at Schichau-Werke, Danzig, on 10 February 1941, launched on 31 January 1942 and commissioned on 18 April with Oberleutnant zur See Konstantin von Puttkamer in command. She served with the 8th U-boat Flotilla for training, then with the 9th flotilla from 1 October 1942 until 31 December 1942, and the 29th flotilla from 1 January 1943 until 23 February for operations.

Design
German Type VIIC submarines were preceded by the shorter Type VIIB submarines. U-443 had a displacement of  when at the surface and  while submerged. She had two shafts and two  propellers.

U-443 was fitted with five  torpedo tubes (four fitted at the bow and one at the stern), fourteen torpedoes, one  SK C/35 naval gun, 220 rounds, and a  C/30 anti-aircraft gun. The boat had a complement of between forty-four and sixty.

Service history

First patrol
U-443 began her operational service when she departed Kiel on 1 October 1942 and sailed out into the Atlantic, clearing the northern coast of Scotland. On 9 October in rough weather, a lookout broke his arm. The U-boat sank two ships from Convoy ON 139 in mid-Atlantic on 22 October, but was then forced to submerge where she was held by the escort ships until the convoy had escaped. She subsequently steamed into Brest in occupied France, arriving on 4 November.

Second patrol
Her second sortie saw her leave Brest on 29 November 1942, penetrate the heavily defended Strait of Gibraltar, sink two more ships in the western Mediterranean and arrive at the Italian port of La Spezia on 22 December.

Third patrol and loss
The U-boat left La Spezia on 16 February 1943 and headed southwest.

Wolfpacks
U-443 took part in two wolfpacks, namely:
 Panther (11 – 16 October 1942) 
 Puma (16 – 29 October 1942)

Summary of raiding history

See also
 Mediterranean U-boat Campaign (World War II)

References

Notes

Citations

Bibliography

External links

German Type VIIC submarines
U-boats commissioned in 1942
U-boats sunk in 1943
World War II submarines of Germany
World War II shipwrecks in the Mediterranean Sea
1942 ships
Ships built in Danzig
U-boats sunk by depth charges
U-boats sunk by British warships
Ships built by Schichau
Ships lost with all hands
Maritime incidents in February 1943